Colón is a Spanish surname, comparable to the Italian and Portuguese Colombo, or English surname Columbus. Notable people with the surname include:

 Bartolo Colón (born 1973), Dominican baseball pitcher
 Carlos Colón, musician, member of The Deadlines
 Carlos Colón (born 1948), Puerto Rican wrestler
 Carly Colón (born 1979), Puerto Rican wrestler, son of Carlos Colón Sr.
 Christian Colón (born 1989), Puerto Rican baseball infielder
 Cristóbal Colón, the Spanish language name for the Italian explorer Christopher Columbus (1451–1506)
 Eddie Colón (born 1982), Puerto Rican wrestler, son of Carlos Colón Sr.
 Ernie Colón (1931–2019), American comics artist
 Jesús Colón (1901–1974), Puerto Rican writer and politician
 Kristiana Rae Colón (born 1986), American poet and playwright
 Orlando Colón (born 1982), Puerto Rican wrestler, nephew of Carlos Colón Sr.
 Willie Colón (born 1950), Puerto Rican American salsa musician

See also
 Colón (disambiguation)
 Colon (disambiguation)

Spanish-language surnames
Surnames of Puerto Rican origin